Ubiquitin-like modifier-activating enzyme 6 is a protein that in humans is encoded by the UBA6 gene.

References

Further reading